The 2015–16 season was the 89th season in ACF Fiorentina's history and their 78th in the top-flight of Italian football. Fiorentina finished the season in 5th place in Serie A, having topped the table early in the season. In the Coppa Italia, the club was eliminated in the round of 16, losing at home to newly promoted Carpi 1–0. Competing in the UEFA Europa League for the third season in a row, Fiorentina limped into second place in their group with a 3–1–2 record, and were eliminated in the Round of 32 by Tottenham Hotspur, 4–1 on aggregate.  The 2015–16 season was also notable for being the first season since the 2011–12 season in which the club was not managed by Vincenzo Montella, who had achieved 4th-place finishes in each of his seasons with the club. Montella was replaced by Basel coach Paulo Sousa.

Players

Squad information
Last updated on 15 May 2016
Appearances include league matches only

Transfers

In

Loans in

Out

Loans out

Pre-season and friendlies

International Champions Cup

Competitions

Overall

Last updated: 15 May 2016

Serie A

League table

Results summary

Results by round

Matches

Coppa Italia

UEFA Europa League

Group stage

Knockout phase

Round of 32

Statistics

Appearances and goals

|-
! colspan=14 style="background:#9400D3; color:#FFFFFF; text-align:center"| Goalkeepers

|-
! colspan=14 style="background:#9400D3; color:#FFFFFF; text-align:center"| Defenders

|-
! colspan=14 style="background:#9400D3; color:#FFFFFF; text-align:center"| Midfielders

|-
! colspan=14 style="background:#9400D3; color:#FFFFFF; text-align:center"| Forwards

|-
! colspan=14 style="background:#9400D3; color:#FFFFFF; text-align:center"| Players transferred out during the season

Goalscorers

Last updated: 15 May 2016

Clean sheets

Last updated: 15 May 2016

Disciplinary record

Last updated: 15 May 2016

References

ACF Fiorentina seasons
Fiorentina
Fiorentina